The Prithimpassa family, also known as the Nawabs of Longla, are an Shia royal family from the Prithimpassa Union, Kulaura Upazila, Moulvibazar, Sylhet, Bangladesh. The family was of the erstwhile feudal nobility of East Bengal. They played important roles in the Indian Rebellion of 1857, the Partition of India and Sylhet referendum in 1947, and the Bangladesh Liberation War of 1971.

Origin
The family was founded by Sakhi Salamat, a Shi'ite Persian nobleman from Khorasan Province, Greater Khorasan an area near the Afghanistan-Iran Border which falls in present day Iran. Salamat had arrived in the Indian subcontinent at the end of the 15th century. After initially residing at the court of the Lodi sultans of Delhi, he later moved to Sylhet, where he was granted land in the Prithimpassa mouza (located in the pargana of Longla) and first married the daughter of Birchandra Narayan, a Hindu prince of the Ita royal family in Rajnagar mouza.

History
Dev Bhallav, a Brahmin Shiqdar of Longla, was on a pilgrimage when he needed money, and so he borrowed fifteen gold coins from Salamat. On another occasion, Salamat visited Bhallav's home and Bhallav's daughter appeared in front of them out of curiosity. Salamat arbitrarily spat and the saliva fell on Bhallav's daughters body. In reaction, Bhallav deemed that both of their Brahmin status had been lost and thus married her off to Salamat, and then migrated to Kashidham.

Ismail Khan Lodi was the son of Sakhi Salamat. He was titled Nawab Amir-ul-Umara in the court of Daud Khan Karrani, Sultan of Bengal. The father of the King, Sulaiman Khan Karrani made him the Governor of Orissa. The title Khan-e-Jahan was later conferred on him by Daud Khan too. He married the daughter of Daud Khan. Ismail Khan Lodi partook in the Battle of Rajmahal which was against the Mughal Empire. After Akbar saw Ismail's bravery he took the aid of his general Shaikh Alauddin Chisti and made Ismail Khan Lodi the local Nawab and provided him assurance over his rule. Ismail had a son named Nawab Shams ad-Din Muhammad Khan (1624-1682).

Ismail's grandson was Muhammad Rabi Khan (d. 1774), who grew to become a respected maulvi and scholar of Persian at the court of the Nawab of Bengal Alivardi Khan in Murshidabad as well as the Naib Nazim of Dhaka. He became a teacher to several children of the ruling Nawab family which included Sarfaraz Khan, Zain ud-Din Ahmed Khan and Nawazish Muhammad Khan. On one occasion, a scorpion entered into his jama without Rabi noticing, whilst he was assembled at the Nawab's court. A while later, the scorpion bit into Rabi, burning his skin and turning him red-faced. Intending to maintain his professionalism at the court, Rabi strived to keep his posture and not react loudly. However, those close to him including Nawab Alivardi Khan noticed something was wrong and asked him what the problem was to which Rabi explained. Impressed by how much respect Rabi showed to him, Alivardi Khan subsequently granted him the title of Danishmand (learned one in Persian) for his wisdom as well as large jagirs. Rabi returned to Prithimpassa after Alivardi's death and also received land-grants from the likes of Nawab Mir Qasim and Emperor Alamgir II. There was even a calendar in his honour at the palaces of the Nawabs in Murshidabad. In 1756, he founded a bazaar near the family estate known as Rabir Bazar (Rabi's market) which remains in existence today in the Kulaura Upazila.

Rabi Khan's son was Muhammad Ali Khan. Muhammad served as the Assistant Qadi of Sylhet in 1773 and later served as the Qadi of Taraf. He assisted the British forces against the rebellious Naga and Kuki tribes in 1793 and as a reward received his own troops and a jagir. Ali Zafar Khan was the second son of Muhammad Ali Khan. He established the Zamindars of Monraj a hereditary family under the Prithimpassa Nawab. Zafar was a Nawabzada by birth and classed as a Zamindar. His established family is currently headed by his descendants.

Gaus Ali Khan was Muhammad's elder son and he was notable for sheltering 300 insurgent sepoys who had looted the Chittagong Treasury during the Indian Rebellion of 1857. His son, Moulvi Ali Ahmad Khan (1842-1874), assisted the British during the Lushai Expedition against the Mizos and as a reward, he was excused from the Indian Arms Act, 1878. During Ahmad's time, the revenue of the estate rapidly increased. Ahmad established Chandni ghat in Sylhet town along the banks of the Surma River. In 1872, he constructed a clock tower in Sylhet which would be completed and named after his son, Ali Amjad Khan. Ahmad's wife was Umara an-Nisa Khatun and they also had a daughter named Latifa Banu.

Moulvi Nawab Ali Amjad Khan (1871 - 1905), an Honorary Magistrate and educationist, had hobbies of horse riding, polo and hunting. He was known to have single-handedly shot 43 tigers. During his tenure, the family had become the wealthiest in Sylhet. He founded the Rangirchhara Tea Estate, the largest native-run tea garden in Bengal. The estate library was opened in 1921. In 1932, he established the Ali Amjad Government Girls' High School in Moulvibazar. He gave out scholarships to schools across Assam and Chittagong, awarded gold medals to students in Tripura, financially assisted needy students and joined the Aligarh Muslim University Committee. In 1901, he accompanied Lord Curzon to Silchar. He gifted a poor boy in his area with one of his own elephants. During a trip to Calcutta, he got typhoid fever and died. Amjad's wife was Syeda Fatima Banu, daughter of Syed Aminuddin Hasan of the Narpati Haveli Bari in Chunarughat, Habiganj.
They had two sons; Ali Haider and Ali Asghar.

Nawab Ali Haider Khan (1896 - 30 June 1963) was politically active throughout the early 20th century. His work included serving as Minister of Agriculture in the cabinet of Muhammed Saadulah, serving as Minister of Power and Water Development in the cabinet of Gopinath Bordoloi, leading the Independent Muslim Party and playing a prominent role in the 1947 Sylhet referendum. He was a member of the Assam Legislative Assembly from 1937 to 1946. In 1950, he hosted Reza Shah of Iran and Khwaja Nazimuddin at his estate for four days and went hunting with them. He married Husna Ara Begum, the daughter of Nawab Wasif Ali Mirza of Murshidabad and had four children; Ali Safdar Khan, Syedatunnisa Begum and Ali Sarwar Khan.

Ali Asghar Khan (1898-1984) was a member of the Assam Legislative Council from 1937 to 1946. He had a son called Ali Yeawar Khan who was born in Calcutta in 1925. Yeawar was a Member of the Provincial Assembly from 1958 to 1968 and was the first chairman of Prithimpasha Union.

Ali Safdar Khan (1919-1974), popularly known as Raja Saheb, was the eldest son of Haider and born in the Hazarduari Palace at Murshidabad. Wife: Sahebzadi Sirajunessa Khatun, the second daughter of Ali Ather Khan from Prithimpassa Chhoto shaheb bari. Safdar was a leftist political leader of the Ballisara peasant movement of the 1960s. He and his brother Ali Sarwar Khan (15 May 1924 - 21 July 1995) took part in the Bangladesh Liberation War as commanders of a regiment from the Tripura borders. Safdar later died on 1974 in Dhaka. Safdar's own son, Ali Abbas Khan was a former member of parliament, educationist and social worker. Safdar's other son, Ali Naqi Khan, was a chairman of Prithimpasha Union Parishad. Safdar's other son, Ali Baquar Khan Hasnain was also a chairman of Prithimpassa Union Parishad.

Syedatunnisa Begum (1923- 6 December 1999), daughter of Haider, was born in Calcutta. She married Wahid Ali Mirza, grandson of Prince Kamar Kadar and great grandson of Nawab of Awadh Wajid Ali Shah. They had a son named Asif Ali Mirza. Wahid later died, and Begum then married Syed Amanat Husayn, superintendent of the Special Police Department of East Pakistan. With Amanat she had 4 children (two sons and two daughters)

Ali Sarwar Khan (1924-1995), He was the youngest child of Nawab Ali Haider Khan. Wife: Sahebzadi Syedatunnessa Begum, the eldest daughter of Nawab of Patna, India MLA Nawabzada Syed Mohammad Mehdi. He was twice MLA during his political tenure. They got married in 1948, October in Patna India in Bawli the Mansion of Nawabzada Syed Mohammad Mehdi. He had his education from St. Edmonds, Shillong and Aligarh University, India. He was a very conscientious and disciplined man and was a very good sportsman. In school he earned his name in boxing. In his father’s Estate he played a prominent and constructive role. He was an accomplished hunter and was a consummate tea planter. During his early years he worked in Etah Tea Estate in 1951. He was twice Member of Constituent Assembly. The first time in 1970, December 9. and again in 1973. He was a freedom fighter and was in charge of the Tripura front. He set up the Muraicherra Tea Estate tea manufacturing factory at the Tea Estate. He died on 21 July 1995 in Dhaka. His son Ali Nadir Khan was a Historian and Social Worker. His other son Ali Wajid Khan was the Senior vice president of Kulaura Upazila Awami League.

Genealogy

The 12 Prithimpassa Nawab's are:

References

Further reading

 The Rise of Islam and the Bengal Frontier, 1204–1760. Richard M. Eaton.
 History of Bengal, Blochman, Akbarnama pg 177.
 Riyaz-ul-Salatin pg 180.
 Ain-I-Akbari pg 520.
 Tazak-I-Jahangiri pg 104.

 
Zamindari estates